Clinidium championi is a species of ground beetle in the subfamily Rhysodinae. It was described by Ross T. Bell & J.R. Bell in 1985. It is known from Quiche Mountains near Totonicapán in Guatemala. It is named after entomologist George Charles Champion, the collector of the holotype.

References

Clinidium
Beetles of Central America
Endemic fauna of Guatemala
Beetles described in 1985